John O'Donnell (c. 1877 – c. 1956) was a rugby union player who represented Australia.

O'Donnell, a hooker, claimed 1 international rugby cap for Australia. His debut game was against Great Britain, at Sydney, on 12 August 1899.

References

Australian rugby union players
Australia international rugby union players
1870s births
1956 deaths
Rugby union hookers